Berzunți is a commune in Bacău County, Western Moldavia, Romania. It is composed of three villages: Berzunți, Buda and Dragomir.

References

Communes in Bacău County
Localities in Western Moldavia